Henryk Bielski (born 19 January 1935) is a Polish film director. His 1983 film Pastorale heroica was entered into the 13th Moscow International Film Festival.

Selected filmography
 Pastorale heroica (1983)

References

External links

1935 births
Living people
Film people from Lviv
People from Lwów Voivodeship
Polish film directors
Recipient of the Meritorious Activist of Culture badge